Syzygium discophorum is a species of plant in the family Myrtaceae. It is a tree endemic to Java in Indonesia. It is an endangered species threatened by habitat loss.

References

discophorum
Endemic flora of Java
Endangered plants
Taxonomy articles created by Polbot